The 1987 Women's Hockey Champions Trophy was the first edition of the Hockey Champions Trophy for women. The tournament was held from 21–28 June 1987, in Amstelveen, Netherlands. 

Netherlands won the tournament, becoming the inaugural champions of the Champions Trophy. Australia and South Korea finished in second and third place, respectively.

Officials
The following umpires were appointed by the FIH to officiate the tournament:

 Jane Hadfield (AUS)
 Christiane Asselman (BEL)
 Margaret Lanning (CAN) 
 Jane Robertson (GBR)
 Laure Lawton (FRA)
 Brigit de Vries (NED) 
 Yolande Mohlmann (NED) 
 Corinne Pritchard (NZL)
 Solobrar Hernández (ESP)

Participating nations

Head Coach: Brian Glencross

 Kathleen Partridge (GK)
 Elspeth Clement
 Liane Tooth
 Tracey Belbin
 Kerrie Richards
 Michelle Capes
 Sandra Pisani
 Deborah Bowman (c)
 Lee Capes
 Kim Small
 Sharon Buchanan
 Jacqueline Pereira
 Loretta Dorman
 Rechelle Hawkes
 Fiona Simpson
 Maree Fish (GK)

Head Coach: Marina van der Merwe

 Sharon Bayes (GK)
 Wendy Baker (GK)
 Deb Covey
 Lisa Lyn
 Laura Branchaud
 Sandra Levy
 Kathryn MacDougal
 Sara Ballantyne
 Danielle Audet
 Shona Schleppe
 Michelle Conn
 Liz Czenczek
 Maria Cuncannon
 Nancy Charlton (c)
 Jody Blaxland
 Sharon Creelman

Head Coach: Dennis Hay

 Jill Atkins
 Wendy Banks (GK)
 Gill Brown
 Karen Brown
 Mary Nevill
 Julie Cook (GK)
 Victoria Dixon
 Wendy Fraser
 Barbara Hambly (c)
 Caroline Jordan
 Violet McBride
 Moira McLeod
 Caroline Rule
 Gillian Messenger
 Kate Parker
 Alison Ramsay

Head Coach: Gijs van Heumen

 Det de Beus (GK)
 Yvonne Buter (GK)
 Terry Sibbing
 Laurien Willemse
 Marjolein Eijsvogel (c)
 Lisanne Lejeune
 Carina Benninga
 Marjolein de Leeuw
 Maryse Abendanon
 Marieke van Doorn
 Sophie von Weiler
 Aletta van Manen
 Noor Holsboer
 Helen van der Ben
 Martine Ohr
 Anneloes Nieuwenhuizen

Head Coach: Pat Barwick

 Leanne Rogers (GK)
 Marie Corcoran (GK)
 Mary Clinton (c)
 Robyn McDonald
 Helen Littleworth
 Kathy Paterson
 Trudy Kilkolly
 Cindy Reriti
 Robyn Toomey
 Christine Arthur
 Anna Symes
 Susan Furmage
 Jan Martin
 Maree Flannery
 Judith Soper
 Donna Flannery

Head Coach: You Young-Chae

 Kim Mi-Sun (GK)
 Han Ok-Kyung
 Kim Mi-Ja
 Choi Young-ja
 Choi Choon-Ok
 Kim Soon-Deok
 Chung Sang-Hyun (c)
 Jin Won-Sim
 Hwang Keum-Sook
 Cho Ki-Hyang
 Seo Kwang-Mi
 Park Soon-Ja
 Kim Young-sook
 Seo Hyo-Sun
 Lim Kye-Sook
 Chung Eun-Kyung (GK)

Results

Pool standings

Matches

Statistics

Final standings

Goalscorers

References

External links
FIH Media Guide

Women's Hockey Champions Trophy
Champions Trophy
Hockey Champions Trophy Womenb
International women's field hockey competitions hosted by the Netherlands
Sports competitions in Amstelveen
Hockey Champions Trophy Women